State Route 303 (SR 303) is a short  state highway in Rhea County, Tennessee. For the majority of its length, it is known as Cranmore Cove Road.

Route description

SR 303 begins in Graysville at an intersection with US 27/SR 29. It goes north through downtown as Dayton Avenue before turning onto Cranmore Cove Road. The highway then goes northeast through a narrow valley between two ridges before coming to an end at an intersection with SR 30 just west of Dayton. The entire route of SR 303 is a two-lane highway.

Major intersections

References

303
Transportation in Rhea County, Tennessee